The 2002 William & Mary Tribe football team represented the College of William & Mary as member of the Atlantic 10 Conference (A-10) during the 2002 NCAA Division I-AA football season. Led by Jimmye Laycock in his 23rd year as head coach, William & Mary finished the season with an overall record of 6–5 and a mark of 5–4 in A-10 play, placing fifth.

Schedule

References

William and Mary
William & Mary Tribe football seasons
William and Mary Indians football